Douglas Township is a township in Montgomery County, Iowa, USA.

History
Douglas Township was organized in 1857.

References

Townships in Montgomery County, Iowa
Townships in Iowa
1857 establishments in Iowa
Populated places established in 1857